The Keeling Curve is a graph that depicts the increase of atmospheric carbon dioxide over the twentieth century. It is named after Charles David Keeling who discovered the rise in carbon dioxide concentrations and plotted the graph.

Keeling may also refer to:

Places
Keeling, Virginia, United States; an unincorporated community
North Keeling, Cocos Islands, Australia; a coral atoll
Cocos (Keeling) Islands, Australia; an Australian external territory

People
Surname
Charles Keeling (1928–2005), American climatologist
Clinton Keeling (1932–2007), British zoologist and author
David Keeling (born 1951), Australian artist
Edward Keeling (1883–1954), British politician
Elsa d'Esterre-Keeling, pen-name of Elizabeth Henrietta Keeling (1857–1935), Irish novelist and translator
Harold Keeling (born 1963) basketball player
Jayson Keeling (born 1966), American artist
John Keeling (1586–1649), English MP
Ralph Keeling (born 1959), American climatologist
Ray Keeling (born 1915), American football player
Stanley Victor Keeling (1894–1979), British philosopher
William Keeling (1577–1619), English sea captain

Other uses
 USS Keeling (codenamed Greyhound), a fictional Mahan-class destroyer created by C.S. Forester for the 1955 World War II novel The Good Shepherd (novel), and also found in the 2020 film adaptation Greyhound (film).

See also

 
 
 Keel (disambiguation)